Erik Solbakken (born 17 November 1984 in Hemsedal) is a Norwegian television presenter. Solbakken hosted the Eurovision Song Contest 2010 together with Haddy Jatou N'jie and Nadia Hasnaoui.

Career
Solbakken trained as a journalist at Volda University College and has worked for the state-owned Norwegian broadcaster NRK, hosting multiple children's shows including Barne-tv, Julemorgen, Krem Nasjonal, and Superkviss, as well as Barnetimen for de minste on NRK P2.

In 2011, Solbakken hosted the prestigious sports award show Idrettsgallaen with Haddy N'jie from Hamar Olympic Amphitheatre which was broadcast live on NRK.

In 2011, he hosted the Eurovision Young Dancers competition in Oslo. Alongside Jenny Skavlan, Solbakken hosted Melodi Grand Prix, the Norwegian national selection for the Eurovision Song Contest, in 2013 and 2014.

See also
 List of Eurovision Song Contest presenters

References

External links

1984 births
Living people
People from Hemsedal
Volda University College alumni
Norwegian television presenters
NRK people